Albena Peninsula is a peninsula extending 13 km in east–west direction and 9 km wide at its base, forming the east extremity of Brabant Island in the Palmer Archipelago, Antarctica.  It is bounded by the terminus of Lister Glacier to the north and by Hill Bay to the south, ending in Spallanzani Point to the east, and has its interior occupied by Stavertsi Ridge.  The peninsula is separated from Davis Island to the north by Sumer Passage.

Albena Peninsula is “named after the Bulgarian seaside resort of Albena, and in connection with the freezer vessel Albena of the Bulgarian company Ocean Fisheries – Burgas whose ships operated in the waters of South Georgia, Kerguelen, the South Orkney Islands, South Shetland Islands and Antarctic Peninsula from 1970 to the early 1990s.  The Bulgarian fishermen, along with those of the Soviet Union, Poland and East Germany are the pioneers of modern Antarctic fishing industry.”

Location
British mapping in 1980 and 2008.

Maps
 Antarctic Digital Database (ADD). Scale 1:250000 topographic map of Antarctica. Scientific Committee on Antarctic Research (SCAR). Since 1993, regularly upgraded and updated.
British Antarctic Territory. Scale 1:200000 topographic map. DOS 610 Series, Sheet W 64 62. Directorate of Overseas Surveys, Tolworth, UK, 1980.
Brabant Island to Argentine Islands. Scale 1:250000 topographic map. British Antarctic Survey, 2008.

Notes

References
 Albena Peninsula. SCAR Composite Gazetteer of Antarctica.
 Bulgarian Antarctic Gazetteer. Antarctic Place-names Commission. (details in Bulgarian, basic data in English)

External links
 Albena Peninsula. Copernix satellite image

Peninsulas of Graham Land
Landforms of the Palmer Archipelago
Bulgaria and the Antarctic
Brabant Island